Kherli railway station is a railway station in Alwar district, Rajasthan. Its code is KL. It serves Kherli. The station consists of 2 platforms. Passenger, Superfast trains halt here.

References

Railway stations in Alwar district
Agra railway division